Eucithara vittata is a small sea snail, a marine gastropod mollusk in the family Mangeliidae.

Description
The shell size varies between 5 mm and 15 mm.

Distribution
This marine genus occurs off Australia (Queensland and Western Australia), off the Philippines, Irian Jaya and Fiji

References

 Reeve, L.A. 1846. Monograph of the genus Mangelia. pls 1-8 in Reeve, L.A. (ed). Conchologia Iconica. London : L. Reeve & Co. Vol. 3.
 Souverbie, S.M. & Montrouzier, R.P. 1872. Diagnoses de Mollusques inedits provenant de la Nouvelle-Caledonie. Journal de Conchyliologie 20: 361-365
  Smith, E.A. 1882. Diagnoses of new species of Pleurotomidae in the British Museum. Annals and Magazine of Natural History 5 10: 296-306
 Odhner, N.H. 1917. Results of Dr E. Mjöbergs Swedish scientific expeditions to Australia. 1910-1913, pt XVII, Mollusca. Kongliga Svenska Vetenskaps-Academiens Nya Handlingar, Stockholm 52(16): 1-115 pls 1-3
 Allan, J.K. 1950. Australian Shells: with related animals living in the sea, in freshwater and on the land. Melbourne : Georgian House xix, 470 pp., 45 pls, 112 text figs.
 Kilburn R.N. 1992. Turridae (Mollusca: Gastropoda) of southern Africa and Mozambique. Part 6. Subfamily Mangeliinae, section 1. Annals of the Natal Museum, 33: 461–575
 Cernohorsky, W.O. 1978. Tropical Pacific Marine Shells. Sydney : Pacific Publications 352 pp., 68 pls.
  Tucker, J.K. 2004 Catalog of recent and fossil turrids (Mollusca: Gastropoda). Zootaxa 682:1-1295.
 

vittata
Gastropods described in 1843